The  San Diego Chargers season was the franchise's 32nd season in the National Football League (NFL) and the 42nd overall  and the third and final season under head coach Mike Riley. The team improved on their 1–15 record in 2000 to finish 5–11 but missed the playoffs for the 6th straight year. It was Mike Riley's final season as the team's head coach. At the end of the season running back LaDainian Tomlinson won the Offensive Rookie of the Year award. Despite finishing 5–11 after losing their final nine games of the season, eight of the Chargers' losses were by less than a touchdown, five of them were by three points, and three of them were by ten points.

Offseason

Becoming the "Bills West"

In December 2000, Buffalo Bills owner Ralph Wilson fired his general manager, John Butler, and his entire staff. The Chargers immediately signed Butler, and within weeks, Butler had cut several players from the roster including quarterback Ryan Leaf, and lured several recognizable names from the 2000 Bills team: defensive end Marcellus Wiley, linebackers Sam Rogers and John Holecek, kicker Steve Christie and most notably, quarterback Doug Flutie, who had been cut by the Bills in a bitter quarterback controversy involving Rob Johnson. With so many former Bills connections, the team was often referred to as the "Bills West". (See also the 1995 Carolina Panthers season, in which Bill Polian brought several Bills contributors from the team's Super Bowl era to Carolina in its inaugural year of play.)

As such, the October 28 matchup between the Bills and Chargers in San Diego was heavily promoted as a dual grudge match, not just between Johnson and Flutie, but also between Wilson and Butler, with Wilson having been quoted as wanting to win the Chargers game more than the Super Bowl. Despite the fact that the Bills were having a very bad season, and the Chargers' fortunes (at the time) had turned significantly, the game was very competitive, coming down to the final minutes play. Trailing 24–20, Flutie scrambled 13 yards to put the Chargers up 27–24; when kicker Jake Arians attempted a 44-yard field goal to tie the game, it was blocked. The Chargers, then 5–2, would not win another game the entire season, going 0–9 in the remaining nine games.

NFL Draft
Michael Vick was selected in the 2001 NFL Draft as the first overall pick and first African American quarterback taken number 1 in the NFL Draft. The San Diego Chargers had the number one selection spot in the draft that year but traded the rights to the first overall choice to the Atlanta Falcons a day before the draft, for which they received the Falcons' first round pick (5th overall) and third round pick in 2001 (used to draft CB Tay Cody), a second round pick in 2002 (used to draft WR Reche Caldwell) and WR/KR Tim Dwight. With the Chargers' downgraded spot (the 5th overall), they selected Texas Christian University running back LaDainian Tomlinson, who went on to become league MVP in 2006. Although Vick has never become league MVP, he finished second in voting in 2004. In this way, Tomlinson and Vick are linked as having been "traded" for each other, although the transaction was actually the result of traded draft picks and contract negotiations. The Chargers' other notable draft pick was Drew Brees, who would eventually win Super Bowl XLIV as a member of the Saints.

Personnel

Staff

Roster

Preseason

Regular season

Schedule

Note: Intra-division opponents are in bold text.

Game summaries

Week 1: vs. Washington Redskins 

Both teams opened with a three-and-out. When Washington punted, Dwight took the ball at his own 16 and profited from good blocking as he wove to the left sideline and completed an 84-yard touchdown without being touched. Dwight and Conway caught passes of 17 and 24 yards from Flutie on back-to-back plays on the next Charger drive, setting up a field goal. When Tomlinson scored his first career touchdown after a short drive in the 2nd quarter, it was 17–0 without Washington having crossed midfield. They did reach a 1st and 10 at the Charger 46 on the following drive, but Jeff George's long pass was then intercepted in the end zone by Alex Molden. Richey's second field goal was set up by a 15-yard Dwight punt return.

Five of the first eight possessions after halftime resulted in turnovers. John Parrella recovered a George fumble in Washington territory, but Flutie was intercepted three plays later. After three punts, Tomlinson fumbled in his own territory, and Washington reached the San Diego 1 yard line before Seau forced a fumble that Rodney Harrison recovered. Two plays later, Conway lost a fumble, setting up the only Washington points of the game. The Chargers responded with Richey's third field goal on their next drive and concluded the scoring when Dwight drew a 34-yard defensive pass interference penalty in the end zone, and Tomlinson scored again two plays later.

The San Diego defense gave up 161 yards, which would be comfortably their best total of the season; both teams committed four turnovers.. Tomlinson's 36 carries were tied for the third-most in Charger history at the time, while his 113 yards rushing yards remain a record for a Charger on debut . Both teams' head coaches (Riley and Marty Schottenheimer) would be sacked at the end of the season, with Schottenheimer taking over the San Diego job.

Week 2: at Dallas Cowboys 

Jamal Williams recovered a mishandled snap at the Dallas 38 on the game's second play. The Cowboys extended the ensuing Charger drive with a penalty on a successful Richey field goal, and Flutie converted 3rd downs with completions to Dwight and Freddie Jones, the latter for a touchdown. After a Dallas three-and-out and a short punt, San Diego again took over in opposition territory, and Flutie again converted two 3rd downs, this time with completions to Graham, and Conway for the touchdown. McNeil intercepted Anthony Wright late in the 1st quarter and lateralled to Harrison, who ran the ball back to the Dallas 43; this time the Chargers added a field goal to lead 17–0 after three possessions each. The Charger defense were beaten by a deep pass on the game's following play, Rocket Ismail catching Wright's pass at the San Diego 25 en route to an 80-yard touchdown. San Diego almost returned the favor later in the half – on 3rd and 4 at the Charger 15, Dwight caught Flutie's pass over the middle at the Dallas 45 and reached the 7 yard line before being tackled for a gain of 78. The Chargers had to settle for another field goal, and Dallas pulled back within six points on their following drive.

Graham gained 34 yards on a flea-flicker on the opening play of the second half, but Tomlinson lost a fumble the play after. The Cowboys were forced to punt, and San Diego drove for another touchdown, Dwight taking an end-around to the left and dodging between tacklers near the sideline before completing a 16-yard touchdown. Conway's 36-yard catch was the biggest play on the drive for Richey's third field goal, after which Wright threw his third touchdown with nine minutes to play. Leading by eight points, San Diego then took six minutes off the clock, but Richey was wide right from 43 yards with a chance to make the game safe. Dallas advanced to their own 43 before McNeil made his second interception of the game and returned the ball 33 yards to the Dallas 34. San Diego had one more scare when Tomlinson fumbled again, but Kendyl Jacox recovered, and Richey hit the clinching field goal soon afterwards.

San Diego dominated several statistical categories, with 475 offensive yards to 289, 5 takeaways to 1, and 26 first downs to 14. Their time of possession was a second short of 38 minutes. The 475 yards of offense were the highest for San Diego since 1986.

Week 3: vs. Cincinnati Bengals 

McNeil intercepted Jon Kitna late in the 1st quarter, leading to a Richey field goal that was wide left from 38 yards. Seau produced another interception two plays later, this time leading to a touchdown; Flutie enjoyed excellent protection before finding Conway ahead of his markers in the end zone. Cincinnati levelled the score shortly before halftime with Chad Johnson's first career touchdown catch.

After both teams punted on their first possession of the second half, Graham got the Chargers over midfield with a 28-yard catch on 3rd and 7, leading to Tomlinson's first touchdown. Harrison forced a Corey Dillon fumble on the next play from scrimmage, with Rogers Beckett recovering. Tomlinson started the ensuing drive with back-to-back carries of 10 and 13 yards, and finished it by going around left end for another touchdown. Cincinnati went three-and-out, and Tomlinson had gains of 23, 19, 4 and 3 yards, the last of these for his third touchdown in as many possessions. The Bengals were able to recover an onside kick after their late touchdown, but McNeil intercepted Kitna again on the next play.

It was McNeil's fifth interception of the season, leading the league at that point. Tomlinson was the first Charger to rush for three touchdowns since Natrone Means in 1994.

Week 4: at Cleveland Browns 

With the score at 3–3 midway through the 2nd quarter, Cleveland faced a 3rd and 17 at their own 7. The Browns gained only 14 yards, but a  face mask penalty on Alex Molden prolonged the drive, which eventually ended with a touchdown shortly before halftime.

On the first play of the 3rd quarter, Tomlinson started to the left but cut back to the right and broke free for a 54-yard gain. Conway caught a 17-yard pass on the next play, then Tomlinson scored from the 2. Cleveland kicker Phil Dawson missed a 48-yard field goal late in the quarter, and the Chargers converted three 3rd downs before Tomlinson's 17-yard run brought up a 1st and goal at the 1. They were driven back two yards and had to settle for a field goal. On the next play from scrimmage, Seau forced a fumble that Orlando Ruff recovered, setting up Richey's third field goal. Dawson pulled his team within three points on the following drive, and San Diego went three-and-out. Tim Couch converted two 3rd downs to Kevin Johnson on the following drive, the latter for the game-winning touchdown with 75 seconds to play. On the game's final drive, Flutie scrambled for 11 yards on 4th and 10, then completed two passes for 27 further yards. That brought the Chargers to the Cleveland 45, from where Flutie threw two incompletions into the end zone to end the game.

Tomlinson's third 100-yard game left him the league-leader in both rushing yards (412) and rushing touchdowns (6). He had already surpassed the 384 yards with which Fletcher led the team the previous season.

Week 5: at New England Patriots 

Trailing 3–0 late in the opening quarter, San Diego reached a 3rd and goal at the 1, but Tomlinson was stopped for a loss of 2 yards, and they settled for a game-tying field goal. Richey missed a 36-yard kick on their next possession. After New England scored the game's first touchdown, San Diego reached a 3rd and 3 and the Patriots 9, but Flutie threw incomplete and they again took a field goal. New England also missed scoring chances in the first half, with Adam Vinatieri failing on both an extra point attempt and a 44-yard field goal as the half ended.

Jenkins returned the opening kickoff 51 yards to the New England 37, but Tomlinson lost a fumble two plays later. The Chargers faced a 3rd and 13 on their own 24 on their next drive, which Flutie converted by finding Conway along the left sideline for a 56-yard completion. This was followed by a 19-yard Conway catch and a 1-yard Tomlinson touchdown on the next two plays. New England responded with a touchdown, but Dwight later gave his offense excellent starting field position with a 26-yard punt return to the opposition 34. That led to Steve Heiden's touchdown, but the Charger lead remained at three points after Bennett mishandled the snap on the extra point attempt. San Diego extended their lead when Patriots punter Lee Johnson tried to dodge Derrick Harris instead of attempting a punt. Harris forced a fumble that he returned for a touchdown himself. New England tied the score with ten points in the final four minutes. First, Antowain Smith gained 5 yards on 4th and 2 midway through a field goal drive then, after Tomlinson was stopped for no gain on a 3rd and 1, they drove 60 yards for a touchdown.

San Diego took over at their own 23 with 31 seconds to play. Tomlinson gained 14 yards, and they called their final timeout. Conway was then tackled just in bounds on a 24-yard reception. Flutie attempted to spike the ball with a second left; after official review, he was ruled to have fumbled while doing so. New England had recovered the ball, but San Diego maintained possession because the whistle had been blown before the recovery. Nonetheless, they lost 2 yards, as the ball was re-spotted where it had landed, and Richey was just short on a 59-yard attempted game-winner. The Chargers received the ball in overtime, but went three-and-out. Molden's 37-yard pass interference penalty helped set up Vinatieri's game-winner.

Week 6: vs. Denver Broncos 

Jenkins put the Chargers ahead to stay when he returned the opening kickoff 88 yards for a touchdown, breaking a single tackle at the Charger 25. After two punts each, McNeil intercepted Brian Griese; the Chargers drove into Denver territory, but Fletcher lost a fumble at the 17. After Denver went three-and-out, Conway gained 28 yards on a double reverse bringing up 1st and goal from the 2. San Diego were unable to reach the end zone, and Richey kicked his first field goal; he added another on the following drive. After Denver got on the scoreboard in the final minute of the first half, Flutie completed four consecutive passes for 39 yards, but was then intercepted on 1st and goal from the 6.

Denver continued their momentum into the second half, drawing within three points with a field goal then forcing a punt. Two plays later, Zeke Moreno forced a fumble that Jason Perry recovered at Denver's 33, setting up Graham's first touchdown. In the final quarter, Wiley deflected a pass that Al Fontenot intercepted. This again set San Diego up in Denver territory, and they once more converted the opportunity with a Graham touchdown. A missed 42-yard field goal by Jason Elam on the following drive effectively made the game safe.

Week 7: vs. Buffalo Bills 

Tomlinson gained 20 yards on the game's first play, and Conway converted 3rd downs with 18- and 16-yard receptions, eventually leading to a field goal. On San Diego's second drive, they reached a 1st and goal at the 1 before losing a yard on two running plays. Flutie then threw incomplete to Graham, but Buffalo were flagged for defensive pass interference, giving the Chargers a fresh set of downs. Jones' touchdown catch came on the next play. Riley sacked Rob Johnson soon afterwards, with Leonardo Carson recovering at the Buffalo 20. The Chargers reached 2nd and goal at the 1, but Tomlinson was stopped twice and Richey added another field goal. The Bills responded midway through the 2nd quarter when Johnson found Peerless Price for 46 yards, and scored himself on the next play. Richey wide right missed from 36 yards, and Bills kicker Jake Arians made a 41-yard field goal as the half ended.

The best scoring chance of the 3rd quarter ended when Arians was short on a 45-yard attempt. In the final period, Perry intercepted an underthrown Johnson pass and returned it 47 yards down the sideline for a touchdown. Johnson bounced back on the next play from scrimmage, finding Price open up the right sideline for a 61-yard touchdown. After Richey was wide right again, this time from 41 yards, the Bills began their go-ahead drive with 6:36 to play. Johnson ran for 6 yards on 3rd and 6, Eric Moulds caught a deflected pass for 31 yards on 3rd and 5, and McNeil committed defensive holding after the Chargers stopped Johnson short on 3rd and goal from the 10. Buffalo took their first lead of the game on the following play, with 90 seconds left. It took the Chargers only 20 seconds to respond: Jenkins returned the kickoff 72 yards to the Buffalo 26, an unsportsmanlike conduct penalty moved the ball to the 13, and Flutie dodged a sack before scrambling up the middle for the winning touchdown. Johnson was able to position Arians for a 44-yard game-tying attempt, but it was blocked by Ed Ellis with 7 seconds left.

Week 8: vs. Kansas City Chiefs 

On their first drive, San Diego reached a 3rd and 7 on the Chiefs 44 before Flutie was intercepted; the ball was run back to the Charger 33, leading to a field goal. The Chargers then went three-and-out, with Bennett's punt only going 26 yards. Priest Holmes had back-to-back runs of 26 and 21 yards as Kansas City drove for their first touchdown, though Parrella blocked the extra point. In the 2nd quarter, San Diego drove as far as the Chiefs 15 before losing yardage on three straight plays, including an 11-yard sack that knocked Flutie out of the game with a concussion. Richey then missed a field goal from 49 yards and, after being given another chance due to a Chiefs penalty, missed from 43 yards as well. After another Kansas City touchdown, Brees entered the game for his first NFL action, but was sacked the first time he dropped back to pass. Kansas City added another field goal for a 19–0 halftime lead.

Cody intercepted Trent Green early in the 3rd quarter, and Brees led four consecutive scoring drives. Firstly, he converted a 4th and 3 with a 6-yard pass to Conway, setting up Richey's first field goal. A Wiley sack of Green pushed Kansas City out of field goal range on the next drive, and Graham's 40-yard catch was the biggest play of an 89-yard drive that featured no 3rd-down conversions and ended with Tomlinson's touchdown run. Next, Graham's 20-yard catch positioned Richey for another field goal. Finally, San Diego moved from their own 11 to a 3rd and 10 at their own 40, from where Brees threw completions on three straight plays: 14 and 26 yards to Conway, then a 20-yard touchdown to Jones in the front of the end zone. Behind for the first time, Kansas City responded immediately, their game-winning touchdown drive draining San Diego's last two timeouts and leaving only 86 seconds to respond. Aided by a personal foul penalty, the Chargers reached Kansas City's 41 with 13 seconds left. Brees then scrambled as far as the 28, but couldn't reach the sidelines to stop the clock. His attempt at a lateral went forwards with 2 seconds left, counting as an illegal forward pass and causing the final seconds to be run off the clock as a penalty.

Brees would later hold the NFL career record for most touchdown passes; Jones caught the first of the 571 touchdowns he would throw during his career. Holmes' 181 rushing yards were the most in any game against the Chargers up to that point.

Week 9: at Denver Broncos 

San Diego failed to cross midfield on any of their first three possessions, punting each time while Denver scored two field goals. The Chargers did manage to reach opposition territory on their next drive, but Flutie was sacked for a loss of 18 on 3rd down. Denver then drove for Griese's first touchdown pass; 39 seconds later he had a second, after Flutie was intercepted deep in Charger territory.

Chargers kick returner Reggie Jones fumbled a punt return early in the 3rd quarter, leading to a Broncos field goal; he then returned the kickoff 74 yards; setting up a Charger field goal. After a fourth Denver field goal, the Broncos led 26–3. San Diego manged their first touchdown on the first play of the 4th quarter, with Conway taking advantage of blown coverage downfield for an easy 72-yard touchdown. On the following Denver drive, Griese fumbled under pressure from Gerald Dixon, with Raylee Johnson recovering and returning the ball 45 yards for an easy touchdown. Fletcher was stopped short on the two-point conversion attempt, leaving the Chargers two scores behind. They got no closer, with Flutie throwing interceptions on their next three drives.

The Chargers gained a season-low 9 first downs. Flutie's 4 interceptions would prove to be the most of his career.

Week 10: at Oakland Raiders 

After the Raiders scored on the game's opening drive, San Diego responded on the next play – Conway took a reverse to the left, then worked his way back around to the right while profiting from several key blocks, eventually completing a 67-yard touchdown. San Diego failed to cross the Raider 40 on their next five possessions, all punts, and trailed to a Jerry Rice touchdown at halftime.

Jenkins returned the second-half kickoff for 67 yards before Raiders kicker Sebastian Janikowski tackled him at the Raider 25. Despite the ensuing drive being prolonged by a Raider penalty on a 3rd down play, San Diego had to settle for a short Richey field goal. McNeil stopped the next Raider drive by intercepting a deep Rich Gannon pass near the goal line, but San Diego went three-and-out, and Oakland soon added a Janikowski field goal. Jenkins returned the next kickoff 93 yards for a touchdown, his second of the season. Zack Crockett converted a 4th and 1 on the following drive, which ended with Rice's second touchdown. Flutie began San Diego's response with completions of 22 and 10 yards to Conway, before finding Graham for 16 yards on a 3rd and 9. Tomlinson finished the drive by going through the line for a touchdown on 3rd and goal from the 1. Each side then punted once before the Raiders drove for Rice's third and game-winning touchdown. Flutie soon fumbled on a 3rd and 7 from his own 33, and Oakland added a field goal to clinch the win.

Raylee Johnson had 3 of the Chargers' 4 sacks.

Week 11: vs. Arizona Cardinals 

On their second possession of the game, San Diego opted to try a field goal on 4th and 1 from the Arizona 8, but Richey missed from 25 yards out. Dixon intercepted Jake Plummer three plays later, and Richey made his second attempt after the offense could only gain 8 yards. Their next possession covered 66 yards in 15 plays, featuring three 3rd-down conversions, but produced no points after Richey missed again, from 27 yards. Arizona responded with an 80-yard touchdown drive, and led 7–3 at halftime.

Arizona reached a 3rd and goal at the 1 on the opening drive of the second half, but Seau and Johnson stopped Michael Pittman short of the end zone and the Cardinals settled for a chip shot Bill Gramatica field goal. A Tomlinson fumble then gave Arizona the ball at the San Diego 36. Pittman converted a 4th and 1, but Perry intercepted a tipped pass at his own 1. On the ensuing 99-yard touchdown drive, Flutie completed 11 of 11 passes for 111 yards, converting three 3rd downs and finding Conway for the game-tying touchdown. When Arizona retook the lead in the final quarter, Flutie responded with completions of 26 yards to Trevor Gaylor and 28 yards to Graham, the latter for a touchdown on the first play after the two minute warning. The Cardinals reached a 3rd and 1 at the Charger 35, which Plummer converted with a 13-yard pass to David Boston. This enabled the Cardinals to run all but a second off the clock, with Gramatica kicking the game-winner from 42 yards.

As well as his 21 carries for 75 yards, Tomlinson caught 13 passes for 72 yards. The 13 receptions set a new record for a Chargers running back. The Chargers lost despite holding the ball for over 34 minutes, outgaining the Cardinals by 392 yards to 298, and creating two of the game's three takeaways. After this game, San Diego signed Steve Christie as their main field goal kicker.

Week 12: at Seattle Seahawks 

Tomlinson opened the game with carries of 10 and 19 yards, but the Chargers' drive stalled and they were forced to punt. Seattle then drove 72 yards to their lone touchdown of the day. In the 2nd quarter, San Diego reached a 3rd and 1 at the Seattle 8, but Tomlinson was stopped for no gain, and Christie came in to convert his first field goal as a Charger. Dwight had catches on three consecutive plays on their next possession, covering 40 yards and positioning Richey for a 53-yard attempt, which he missed wide left 11 seconds before halftime.

San Diego took the lead with a touchdown drive midway through the 3rd quarter. Flutie completed consecutive 15-yard passes to Conway and Tomlinson, before Tomlinson barely crossed the goal line on 3rd and goal from the 1. After Seattle tied the score, the Chargers reached a 2nd and 4 at the Seahawks 19, but a Flutie pass was deflected and intercepted. On their following drive they faced 3rd and 6 at the Seahawks 42. Graham caught an 8-yard pass, but fumbled and Seattle recovered. Seahawks kicker Ryan Lindell missed a 43-yard field goal on the next drive and, following a Chargers three-and-out, missed a 48-yard kick as time expired in regulation. However, he got a third chance after Seattle won the overtime coin toss, winning the game from 24 yards out.

Both teams entered the game having lost seven consecutive overtime times in games that went to overtime. , the Chargers' eight straight overtime loss represents the second-worst such run in NFL history, behind the New England Patriots with ten consecutive from 1977 to 1987.

Week 13: at Philadelphia Eagles 

Philadelphia opened the scoring on their first possession of the game, but San Diego quickly tied the score. Graham converted a 3rd and 10 with a 16-yard catch, then scored a 61-yard touchdown on a 3rd and 9. Graham jumped and reached over the shoulders of defensive back Troy Vincent for an underthrown ball, bobbling it briefly before completing the catch at the Philadelphia 40 and racing into the end zone. Later in the opening quarter, Dwight took a pass in the left flat for 29 yards; two plays later, San Diego had a 3rd and 1 at the Eagles 38. Tomlinson then fumbled while trying to make a cut, with Brian Dawkins recovering and scoring when Tomlinson could not make the tackle. Two further Charger drives that crossed midfield ended with a Flutie interception and a missed 34-yard field goal by Christie. After Philadelphia extended their lead late in the half, San Diego were able to respond in less than a minute. Flutie completed 4 of 6 passes for 60 yards on the drive, including a 29-yard connection with Conway and a 10-yard touchdown to Graham.

While San Diego's defense kept Philadelphia out of the end zone in the second half, the offense struggled, failing to cross midfield on any of their first six possessions. The fifth of these ended when Flutie lost a fumble while scrambling for a first down, leading to a Philadelphia field goal. The Chargers did manage a longer drive late in the game starting from their own 4 yard line and advancing over midfield with back-to-back Jones catches of 34 and 20 yards. The drive stalled at the Philadelphia 19, and Christie missed a 37-yard field goal to effectively decide the game.

Tomlinson passed the 1,000-yard rushing milestone during the game. He was the first Charger to do so since Natrone Means in 1994, and the first Charger rookie since Don Woods in 1974.

Week 14: vs. Oakland Raiders 

Oakland reached the San Diego 1 yard line in the opening quarter, but settled for a field goal after Gannon threw incomplete on 3rd and goal. In response, the Chargers converted three 3rd downs before their drive stalled at the Oakland 11 and Christie tied the score. All other drives in the first half ended with punts.

Flutie opened the second half by completing his first four passes for 55 yards, guiding the Chargers to a 2nd and 8 at the 11. His next pass, however, was thrown into the arms of defensive lineman Darrell Russell for an interception. Oakland drove 88 yards the other way, and Rice beat Beckett to score his fourth touchdown in two games against the Chargers. Two plays later, a Flutie pass deflected off Conway and was intercepted, but the Chargers got the ball back soon afterwards when Beckett forced a fumble and Johnson recovered. The ensuing drive was extended when Tim Brown muffed a Bennett punt and Jenkins recovered at the Oakland 15, though the Chargers could only capitalize with another field goal. Harrison intercepted a deflected pass, and Flutie converted a 4th and 1 with a 5-yard pass to Conway. The Chargers reached 2nd and goal from the 2 with six minutes to play before Flutie was intercepted for a third time. Oakland drained the last Charger timeout and all but 67 seconds of the clock before Janikowski's second field goal. Jenkins returned the ensuing kickoff 38 yards, and a 34-yard catch and run by Conway had the Chargers at the Oakland 24. After two plays gained one yard, Flutie overthrew Graham in the end zone, then Graham dropped his 4th-down pass inside the 10 with 15 seconds to play.

Week 15: at Kansas City Chiefs 

On the game's opening drive, Trent Green converted three 3rd down situations with completions to Snoop Minnis, and a fourth with a touchdown to Jason Dunn. San Diego responded with Tomlinson's 34-yard run around right end setting up Jones' touchdown catch. Beckett intercepted Green on the next play, and Tomlinson had back-to-back gains of 10 and 22 yards to move the Chargers across midfield, but they eventually punted from the Chiefs' 36 yard line. The closest either team came to scoring for the rest of the half was a missed 41-yard field goal by Kansas City kicker Todd Peterson.

Kansas City retook the lead with a 3rd quarter field goal. Following an exchange of punts, San Diego drove to a 2nd and goal from the 4, whereupon Conway was ruled to have caught a Flutie pass out of bounds; the call was reversed to a touchdown on official review. Following another Peterson field goal, Conway converted a 3rd and 26 with a 27-yard catch, eventually leading to a 46-yard field goal that Richey missed wide left. McNeil intercepted Green on the following play, and a 27-yard catch by Trevor Gaylor moved the Chargers back into Chiefs territory, and Christie extended their lead with a 27-yard field goal five minutes from time. Green and Minnis combined for 21 yards on 3rd and 4 as Kansas City drove inside the San Diego 10 yard line. A controversial play then followed, as Green was intercepted by Leonardo Carson, but the Chiefs retained the ball when Harrison was judged to have struck Green with a forearm after he threw, counting as roughing the passer. Tony Richardson scored the winning touchdown three plays later. The game ended with a Charger false start penalty on their own 29 yard line, causing a ten-second runoff.

Week 16: vs. Seattle Seahawks 

Conway opened the scoring four plays after Jeff Feagles shanked a 13-yard punt for Seattle, then set up a field goal with a 38-yard catch, made while drawing a defensive pass interference flag. Conway had 21- and 18-yard catches on the following drive, but had an 11-yard touchdown ruled out when he was judged to have stepped out of bounds prior to making the catch; the Chargers settled for another field goal, and a 13–0 lead. Trent Dilfer and Darrell Jackson turned the game around by combining for two similar touchdowns in the space of five minutes, with Jackson beating McNeil for catches 45 yards up the left sideline both times.

In the second half, Christie restored the Charger lead with his third field goal, striking both the right upright and the crossbar before going through. Dilfer responded with passes for a touchdown and a two point conversion. A 31-yard catch by Gaylor moved San Diego into opposition territory early in the final period. The Chargers reached a 3rd and 1 from the 19, but Tomlinson was stopped inches short; they were poised to go for it on 4th down, but Jacox was flagged for a false start, and Christie hit another field goal instead. Lindell missed a 48-yard field goal with 2:37 to play, and Flutie completed four passes while leading his team from the San Diego 39 to a 1st down at the Seattle 11. He was sacked for a loss of 7 on the next play, then threw two incompletions before Christie converted his fifth field goal from five attempts with 16 seconds to play. Charlie Rogers fielded the ensuing kickoff at his own goal line and returned it for 64 yards before Jenkins caught him from behind. Lindell's 54-yard game-winning kick easily cleared the uprights as time expired.

Conway's 11 catches and 156 receiving yards would both be career highs. Also, Flutie's 34 completions, 53 attempts and 377 yards would all be career highs.

Standings

Notes

References

San Diego Chargers
San Diego Chargers seasons
San Diego